Afrodromia is a genus of flies in the family Empididae.

Species
A. angularis Smith, 1969
A. bicolor Smith, 1969
A. concolor Smith, 1969
A. flavifemur Smith, 1969
A. fulgida Smith, 1969
A. genitalis Smith, 1969
A. julianus Smith, 1969
A. longicornis Smith, 1969
A. maculifemur Smith, 1969
A. montana Smith, 1969
A. reducta Smith, 1969
A. semperviva Smith, 1969
A. sinuosa Smith, 1969

References

Empidoidea genera
Empididae